Sue-Anne Webster is an Australian magician, actor and writer who has been recognised internationally for her contributions to the art of magic.

Biography

Sue-Anne Webster trained as an actor at The Australian Playhouse Studio and The Actor's Centre in Sydney, and was Assistant Director at the Australian Broadcasting Corporation for programs including Beatbox and the mini-series Tusitala., She has performed as an actor on television programs including Real Life, The Masters, and several television commercials. She has performed as an illusionist on television programs including The Price Is Right, Location Location Amazing Homes, StarStruck, Today, Mornings with Kerri-Anne, Good Morning Australia with Bert Newton, Fox Morning News (USA), Top Billing (South Africa), The 23rd FISM World Championships of Magic Stockholm 2006 (UK), WB Kids, ETV (Hong Kong), and Nadia Tass's Australian feature film Matching Jack (2010).

Theatrical and magical shows which Sue-Anne Webster has created and directed include: Cunning Stunts, Dreams & Illusions, Magic Unlimited's Best Show Ever, Wizards of Aus, Illusionarium, and Private Eye.

In addition, Webster is one of two living Australian magicians to be included in the book Dictionnaire de la Prestidigitation covering the world history of the art of magic, and is the only Australian to be included in Historias de Magas Antiguas y Modernas, an international history book of prominent female magicians throughout history. Webster is founder and first president of the Australian Institute of Magic.

In 2001, Sue-Anne Webster and Tim Ellis were voted Most Valuable Performers by their peers at the close up magic convention Fechter's Finger Flicking Frolic in Batavia, New York. In 2005 was the duo were nominated Lecturers of the Year by The Academy of Magical Arts at The Magic Castle in Hollywood.

Webster has frequently worked as a consultant on magic for television including The Panel and Blue Heelers.

Author
From 2010 to 2012, Webster wrote a regular magic column in the NSW School Magazine, the oldest literary magazine for children in the world. Her writings in the magic world include contributions to Magic Magazine and Genii. She has also had many articles published in New Idea, Reader's Digest, That's Life! and Australian Geographic.

I Dream of Jeannie
Webster is also the official I Dream of Jeannie 'Jeannie' lookalike for www.IDreamOfJeannie.com and is recognised internationally for her uncanny characterisation. In 2009, she presented an 'I Dream of Jeannie Tribute Show' at the Melbourne Magic Festival.

Theatre
She premiered two shows in 2008, one for The Melbourne International Comedy Festival Illusionarium with Ellis & Webster and The Wizards of Aus at The Melbourne Magic Festival, and many more shows including Ellis in Wonderland (2009), Illusionarium 2010 and I Dream of Jeannie solo (2010), Once Upon A Time..., and Secrets (2011), Phyllis Wong and the Forgotten Secrets of Mr Okyto magic performances at promotional appearances with author and husband Geoffrey McSkimming.

Awards and honours
 Queen's Scout Award (1981)
 Nominated Lecturers of the Year (with Tim Ellis) - The Magic Castle, Hollywood (2005)
 Guinness World Record (with team of Melbourne magicians) - World's Longest Magic Show, 75 hours (2004)
 Best Stage Magic Act in Australia - National Australian Magic Convention (2004)
 Most Valuable Participants (with Tim Ellis) - Fechter's Finger Flicking Frolic, New York (2001)
 Silver Medal, Stage Magic - National Australian Magic Convention (1999)
 Best Actress Award, Ignite Film Festival (2008)
 Best Actress Award, Ignite Film Festival (2010)

Published works
 AMM 2000 - Monthly National Magazine, Co Editor with Tim Ellis(2000)
 Ellis in Wonderland - Lecture Notes (2000)
 24 Years of Living Next Door to Ellis (2001)
 Have You Ever Thought About School Tours? - Lecture Notes (2001)

Videos & DVDs
 Ellis in Wonderland (2004)
 24 Years of Living Next Door to Ellis (2004)
 Runaround Sue (2004)
 Ellis & Webster's Cunning Stunts (2006)
 Ellis & Webster's Most Amazing Magic Volume 1
 Ellis & Webster's Most Amazing Magic Volume 2

References

External links
 Sue-Anne Webster's main website
 

1965 births
Australian magicians
People from Sydney
Living people
Female magicians